The Temple of Athena is a hexastyle peripteral Doric temple built in Syracuse in the 5th century BC by the tyrant Gelo after his victory over the Carthaginians at the Battle of Himera.
The temple was preceded by a cult site which dated back to the 8th century BC, with an altar discovered in excavation at the beginning of the twentieth century, and by an earlier temple from the middle of the sixth century BC.

History

Gelo and the construction of the temple 

Right where the temple of Athena is located, there once was another, more archaic temple, still in the doric style, as archaeological discoveries during the excavations of 1912 and 1917 confirmed. They included architectural elements, terracottas and part of an altar, datable to the sixth century BC.

The Athenaion was built, according to the literary sources, by Gelo, the first tyrant of Syracuse, who came from the Deinomenid dynasty of Gela, after his victory over the Carthaginians at the Battle of Himera in 480 BC. The similarity of the Temple of Athena to the Temple of Victory at Himera has convinced archaeologists that both the date and circumstances of the temple's construction given in the literary sources are correct.

The temple was dedicated to Athena, goddess of wisdom and warfare, as testified by Cicero in his Verrine Orations and also by Plato and Athenaeus. Cicero provides extensive details in his speech, claiming that the temple had been respected by the conqueror of Syracuse, Marcus Claudius Marcellus and had only been plundered by the praetor Verres.

Structure of the Temple 

The Athenaio was a peripteral temple with six columns on the short sides and fourteen on the long sides. On the front, the intercolumniation at either edge was reduced, the canonical solution to issues of perspective. In total, the building was 22 metres wide and 55 metres long. The peristyle surrounded a cella with a pronaos and an opisthodomos, both featuring two columns in antis.

The temple was converted into a Christian place of worship and parts of it are still found incorporated into the walls of the Cathedral of Syracuse.
On the left side of the Duomo, some columns of local limestone and the stylobate on which they stood remain visible. Other remains (marble tiles and water spouts shaped like lion's heads) are preserved in the Museo Archeologico Regionale Paolo Orsi. Inside the Duomo, 9 further columns from the right side of the peripteros are clearly visible, with a pronounced entasis, as well as the two from the front of the cella.

Architecture and pictorial decoration 

This is the description which Tommaso Fazello gave of the gilt shield located in the pediment of the Syracusan temple.

From Cicero, who lists the decorations pillaged by Verres, we know that it was decorated with ivory, golden bosses on the doors, and a series of painted panels depicting a cavalry battle between Agathokles and the Carthaginians, as well as 27 portraits of the city's tyrants.

See also
 List of Ancient Greek temples

References

External links 

Il-tempio-di-Athena -Cattedrale-di-Siracusa
Tempio di Athena - Biennale internazionale d'ate contemporanea a Siracusa
Tempio di Artemide e di Minerva in 3D 

5th-century BC religious buildings and structures
Athena
Syracuse
Ancient Syracuse
Archaeological sites in Siracusa